Gimo may refer to: 
  
 Gimo, Sweden
 Gimo Air Base
 Guillermo C. de Vega (1931–1975), nicknamed Gimo, Philippine politician
 Chiang Kai-shek (1887 -1975), nicknamed Gimo, Chinese politician and former leader of the Kuomintang